Paul Demers (March 9, 1956 – October 29, 2016) was a Canadian singer-songwriter. He was best known for writing the song "Notre Place", which came to be recognized as an anthem of the Franco-Ontarian community.

Background
Born in Gatineau, Quebec, his family moved to Ottawa, Ontario when he was 16. He began performing as a musician in adulthood, touring music festivals across Ontario and forming the band Purlaine in 1979. Following a diagnosis of non-Hodgkin's lymphoma in the early 1980s, however, he took several years off from music to undergo cancer treatment.

"Notre place"
He came out of retirement in 1986 to write the lyrics to "Notre place", which was originally commissioned for a gala to celebrate the passage of Ontario's 1986 French Language Services Act. The song came to be adopted as the Franco-Ontarian community's unofficial anthem, and was formally designated as the community's official anthem by the Legislative Assembly of Ontario in 2017.

Following "Notre place", Demers returned to touring, both as a solo artist and with musicians Robert Paquette and Marcel Aymar in the group Paquette-Aymar-Demers, released three albums, and worked as a theatre producer and director. A biography of him, by writer Pierre Albert, was published by Éditions Interligne in 1992.

Death
Demers was diagnosed with mesothelioma in January 2016. He gave a retrospective interview from his hospital bed to the Ici Radio-Canada Première program Grands Lacs Café in the fall, prior to his death on October 29.

Discography
Paul Demers (1990)
D’hier à toujours (1999)
Encore une fois (2011)

References

1956 births
2016 deaths
Canadian rock singers
Canadian folk singer-songwriters
Canadian male singer-songwriters
French-language singers of Canada
Musicians from Gatineau
Musicians from Ottawa
French Quebecers
Franco-Ontarian people
Canadian theatre directors
20th-century Canadian guitarists
21st-century Canadian guitarists
20th-century Canadian male singers
21st-century Canadian male singers